The nitronickelates are a class of chemical compounds containing a nickel atom complexed by nitro groups, -NO2.
Nickel can be in a +2 or +3 oxidation state. There can be five (pentanitronickelates), or six, (hexanitronickelates) nitro groups per nickel atom. They can be considered the double nitrites of nickel nitrite.

References

Nickel complexes
Nitrites
Anions